Khalilan-e Sofla (also Romanized as Khalīlān-e Soflá; also known as Khalīlān-e Pā'īn) is a village in Qaedrahmat Rural District, Zagheh District, Khorramabad County, Lorestan Province, Iran. At the 2006 census, its population was 187, in 44 families.

References 

Towns and villages in Khorramabad County